Charles Edwin Bessey (21 May 1845 – 25 February 1915) was an American botanist.

Biography
He was born at Milton, Wayne County, Ohio.  He graduated in 1869 at the Michigan Agricultural College.  Bessey also studied at Harvard University under Asa Gray, in 1872 and in 1875–76. He was professor of botany at the Iowa Agricultural College, today known as Iowa State University from 1870 to 1884.  In 1884, he was appointed professor of botany at the University of Nebraska and became head dean there in 1909. He also served as Chancellor of the University of Nebraska from 1888 to 1891 and again from 1899 to 1900.  He served as president of the American Association for the Advancement of Science in 1911. Bessey's son, Ernst Bessey was Professor of Mycology and Botany at Michigan State University. His other two sons, Edward and Carl, specialized in electrical engineering.

Selected publications

Books 
 The Geography of Iowa (Cincinnati, 1878)
 Botany for High Schools and Colleges (New York, 1880)
 revision of McNab's Botany (1881)
 The Essentials of Botany (1884); 
 Elementary Botany (1904)
 Plant Migration Studies (1905)
 Synopsis of Plant Phyla (1907)
 Outlines of Plant Phyla (1909)
  written with others, New Elementary Agriculture (ninth edition, 1911)

Articles

Legacy
His arrangement of flowering plants taxa, with focus on the evolutionary divergence of primitive forms, is considered by many as the system most likely to form the basis of a modern, comprehensive taxonomy of the plant kingdom.

In 1967, Iowa State University built a Plant Industry Building, which was named after Bessey. Today the building is used by departments in the biological sciences.

In 2009 he was inducted to the Nebraska Hall of Fame.

See also
Bessey system, his taxonomic plant system.
Nebraska National Forest

References

Bibliography

 
Overfield, Richard A. Science With Practice: Charles E. Bessey and the Maturing of American Botany.  Iowa State University Press Series in the History of Technology and Science. Iowa State Press, 1993.
Pool, Raymond J. A brief sketch of the life and work of Charles Edwin Bessey. Botanical Society of America, 1915.
Tobey, Ronald C. 1981. Saving the Prairies: The Life Cycle of the Founding School of American Plant Ecology, 1895-1955. Berkeley: University of California Press.

External links

Charles Bessey papers at the Iowa State University Library. Retrieved on July 10, 2009.
Charles Bessey papers at the University of Nebraska-Lincoln. Retrieved on October 13, 2009.

1845 births
1915 deaths
American science writers
American botanists
American botanical writers
American male non-fiction writers
Michigan State University alumni
Harvard University alumni
Iowa State University faculty
University of Nebraska–Lincoln faculty
People from Wayne County, Ohio
Chancellors of the University of Nebraska-Lincoln